The Petrified Springs Fault is a right lateral-moving (dextral) geologic fault located in western Nevada, United States.  It is considered an integral part of the Walker Lane.

References

Seismic faults of Nevada